Uruapan International Airport , also known as "Lic. y Gen. Ignacio López Rayón International Airport", serves the Mexican city of Uruapan, and it is the second-busiest and second-largest international gateway of the Mexican state of Michoacán after Morelia International Airport. It has one terminal. The airport is operated by Aeropuertos y Servicios Auxiliares, a federal government-owned corporation.

The airport sports an asphalt runway 2,400 meters (or 7,874 feet) in length, capable of accommodating aircraft such as the Boeing 737 and the Airbus A320. The runway's approach vectors are 20 degrees for the north end of the runway and 200 degrees for the south end. The runway is located at an elevation of 1,603 meters (5,258 feet, or just short of a mile) above sea level.

In 2021, the airport handled 167,112 passengers, and in 2022 it handled 151,151 passengers.

History
The first air services to the city of Uruapan were in 1937 to Acapulco. The current airport was incorporated to the ASA network in the year of 1970. Aero Cuahonte and Aero Sudpacífico were once regional airlines based at the airport.  In the past, it has also been served by airlines such as Aeromar, Avolar, Lineas Aereas Azteca and TAESA Airlines. The first international services to Uruapan began in October 2012, with Volaris to Los Angeles.

Airlines and destinations

Destinations map

Statistics

Passengers

Accidents and incidents
TAESA Flight 725, a DC-9, crashed on take-off from Uruapan international airport en route to Mexico City on November 25, 1999, killing all 18 people on board.

See also 

List of the busiest airports in Mexico

References

External links
 Uruapan Intl. Airport

Airports in Michoacán